Romblon College was a defunct private college located in barangay Liwayway in Odiongan, Romblon. It was founded in 1948. Its president was Nellie G. De Castro.

Programs Offered
Bachelor of Arts 
Bachelor of Elementary Education  
Bachelor of Secondary Education  
1 yr. General Clerical Course  
Associate in Computer Science  
1 yr. Nursing Aide  
2 yr. Computer Programming  
2 yr. Food Prep and Service Technology 
2 yr. Nursing Aide  
2 yr. Office Management with Computer 
2 yr. Police Science  
2 yr. Tourism and Travel Specialist  
Complete Secondary Course (High school)

References

State universities and colleges in the Philippines
Universities and colleges in Romblon
Defunct universities and colleges in the Philippines